Milluni Peak, also known as or Pico Milluni (composed of Spanish pico peak and Aymara milluni, millu light brown, reddish, fair-haired, dark chestnut, -ni suffix to indicate ownership, "the brown one"), is a mountain in the Andes, about 5,483 m (17,989 ft) high, located in the Cordillera Real of Bolivia in the La Paz Department, Pedro Domingo Murillo Province, El Alto Municipality. It is situated south of Wayna Potosí and northeast of El Alto and La Paz.

See also

 Chacaltaya
 Janq'u Quta
 Laram Quta
 Milluni Lake
 Phaq'u Quta
 Zongo River 
 List of mountains in the Andes

References 

Mountains of La Paz Department (Bolivia)